Pretoria News is a daily English-medium newspaper established in 1898 in South Africa's capital city Pretoria. It is distributed in the Tshwane Metropolitan area. Pretoria News covers a range of local news, as well as national and international news, comment and analysis by experts, sport, entertainment and lifestyle. It publishes a daily edition from Monday to Friday and also offers a weekend edition. Pretoria News is part of the Independent Media South Africa group and is available online via the Independent Online website.

History
The Pretoria News was first published in Pretoria on 13 June 1898 by Leo Weinthal as an afternoon paper. Roderick Jones edited it up until the beginning of the Second Boer War, ceasing publication on 30 September 1899. It resumed publication on 8 December 1902, now owned by A.E. Reno's Pretoria Printing Works, with capital provided by the Transvaal Colonial government under Lord Milner. Sir Ernest Chappell was its major shareholder when he sold the share to the Argus Group in 1929. The rest of shares were owned by South African Associated Newspapers. On the 7 September 1972, it was renamed the Pretoria News.

Editors

 A.E. Reno (1902 - 1910)
 Vere P. Stent (1910 - 1920)
 W.S. Rayner (1920 - 1924)
 J.A. Gray (1924 - 1932)
 Rex V. Hall (1932 - 1941)
 J.S.M. Simpson (1941 - 1950)
 E.H. Howse (1950- 1955)
 D.D. Sargent (1955 - 1958)
 J.W. Patten (1959 - 1962)
 R.A. Gill (1962 - 1970)
 Tertius Myburgh (1971 - 1975)

Digital presence 
Pretoria News has a number of daily supplements that cater to a variety of readers. These supplements are then placed on IOL online to reach digital audiences. The content is targeted at those who live and work in Pretoria and Tshwane.

Products 
Pretoria News houses the Business Report newspaper (a widely read financial newspaper in South Africa), as well as a carrier for the following supplements:

 Auctions
 Business Report
 Talent 360
 Drive 360
 Good Life
 Home

The mood shifts on Saturday, and Pretoria News Weekend offers a more leisurely read. It consists of a compelling mix of news and background features, previews and major sporting action at the weekend, top horse racing tips from an award-winning tipster, as well as a review of the week in brief.

Awards 

 2010 National Press Club – North-West University Journalist of the Year competition – Graeme Hosken 
 2012 SA Sports Awards – Excellence in Sports Journalism – Pretoria News rugby writer Vata Ngobeni
 2013 – Society Upliftment Award through Newsmaker of the Year ceremony.
 2018 – Standard Bank Sikuvile Journalism Awards – Bongani Shilubane

Supplements
Business Report (Monday-Friday)
Tonight (Monday-Friday)
Workplace (Monday & Wednesday)
Motoring (Thursday)
Play (Once a month)

Distribution areas

Distribution figures

Readership figures

See also

 List of newspapers in South Africa

References

External links
 
 newspaperdirect.com reader
 SAARF Website

Mass media in Pretoria
Daily newspapers published in South Africa